Juan González (born 1 January 1988), is a Colombian footballer who plays as a defender for South Florida Surf in the Premier Development League.

References 

1988 births
Living people
Colombian footballers
Colombian expatriate footballers
New York Cosmos (2010) players
South Florida Surf players
Expatriate soccer players in the United States
North American Soccer League players
Association football defenders
USL League Two players
Soccer players from Florida
Footballers from Cali